Reginald, Reggie or Reg Jones may refer to:

Reginald H. Jones (1917–2003), English chairman of General Electric, 1972–1981
Reginald Jones (artist) (1857–1920), English landscape painter
Reginald Victor Jones (1911–1997), English physicist and scientific military intelligence expert
Reggie Jones (cornerback, born 1969), former professional American football player for the New Orleans Saints
Reggie Jones (cornerback, born 1986), American football cornerback for the Washington Redskins
Reggie Jones (wide receiver) (born 1971), American football player and triple jumper
Reggie Jones (boxer) (born 1951), American boxer
Roger Jones (footballer, born 1902) (Reginald Jones, 1902–1967), English soccer player
Reggie Jones (sprinter) (born 1953), American sprinter of the 1970s
Reg Jones (rugby), Welsh rugby union and rugby league footballer of the 1940s
Reginald Jones (rugby league), rugby league player
Reginald L. Jones (1931–2005), clinical psychologist and college professor